The Beijing–Nanning–Hanoi through train (Chinese: 北京-南宁-河内国际列车) is an international railway service between Gia Lâm railway station (via Dong Dang railway station) in Vietnam and the Beijing West railway station in China, jointly operated by Nanning Railway Bureau of China's national rail service, with service provided by Nanning Passenger Service Department. The train runs to Beijing and Hanoi every three days.

The train runs along the Jingguang railway, followed by the Hengyang–Liuzhou Intercity Railway, the 
Liuzhou–Nanning Intercity Railway, and the Xianggui railway. It crosses into Vietnam at Dongdang and completes its journey on the dual gauge Hanoi–Đồng Đăng railway. The total journey time is approximately 36 hours, and the train uses 25T class train carriages.

Locomotive routing 
Beijing West–Nanning: China Railways HXD3D, Beijing Locomotive Depot, Beijing Railway Bureau
Nanning–Dong Dang: China Railways DF4D, Nanning Locomotive Depot, Nanning Railway Bureau
Dong Dang–Hanoi (Gia Lâm): Vietnam Railways D14E, Vietnam Railways

See also
Nanning railway station
T189/190 Beijing–Nanning through train

References

External links

 T5 / 6 train to take a passenger task by Nanning passenger segment of Nanning Railway Bureau

Z
Rail transport in Guangxi
Rail transport in Vietnam